Márk Bencze (born 30 January 2000) is a Hungarian professional footballer who plays for Győr.

Club career
On 10 February 2022, Bencze signed with Szeged-Csanád.

On 22 June 2022, he moved to Győr on a two-year deal.

Career statistics
.

References

External links
 
 

2000 births
Footballers from Budapest
21st-century Hungarian people
Living people
Hungarian footballers
Hungary youth international footballers
Association football midfielders
BFC Siófok players
Mezőkövesdi SE footballers
Csákvári TK players
Szeged-Csanád Grosics Akadémia footballers
Győri ETO FC players
Nemzeti Bajnokság II players
Nemzeti Bajnokság I players
Hungarian expatriate footballers
Expatriate footballers in the Netherlands
Hungarian expatriate sportspeople in the Netherlands